The 2005 Formula Renault 2.0 UK Championship was the 17th British Formula Renault Championship. The season began at Donington Park on 10 April and ended on 2 October at Donington, after twenty rounds held in England and Scotland, with all except round eight supporting the British Touring Car Championship.

Teams and drivers

Race calendar and results

Drivers' Championship

 Points were awarded on a 32-28-25-22-20-18-16-14-12-11-10-9-8-7-6-5-4-3-2-1 basis, with 1 point for fastest lap. A driver's 18 best results counted towards the championship.

External links
 The official website of the Formula Renault UK Championship

UK
Formula Renault UK season
Renault 2.0 UK